Curtis Osborne (March 1970 – June 4, 2008) was an American convicted murderer on death row in Georgia from Spalding County. He murdered Arthur Lee Jones and Linda Lisa Seaborne in 1990 to avoid paying a $400 debt. Johnny Mostiler, his court-appointed attorney, allegedly neglected to inform Osborne that the prosecutor had offered him a life sentence in exchange for a plea bargain, declaring "That little nigger deserves the death penalty." Osborne's case for clemency was championed by former U.S. President Jimmy Carter and former Deputy U.S. Attorney General Larry Thompson, who wrote letters to the clemency board pleading for mercy. Former U.S. Attorney General Griffin Bell also spoke on his behalf. His execution was carried out despite these appeals.

Murders 
On August 7, 1990, the bodies of Arthur Lee Jones and Linda Lisa Seaborne were found in an abandoned car on a dirt road in Spalding County, Georgia. Both victims had been shot in the head, with Jones sustaining a gunshot wound just below his left eye and Seaborne sustaining a gunshot wound to her neck. Three weeks before the murders, Jones had asked Osborne, his sister's boyfriend, to help him sell a motorcycle. Osborne had sold the motorcycle for USD 400 and kept the money. Osborne was interviewed by authorities and eventually admitted to the crime. He claimed, however, that Jones had reached towards the floor for a weapon, and he had acted in self-defense. However, evidence from the crime scene showed Jones had been sitting upright when Osborne shot him and that the gun was only an inch away from his skull. Osborne's mother later testified that her husband's .357 Ruger was missing, a gun which was already suspected as the murder weapon. The gun was never recovered.

Trial 
In October 1990, Osborne was indicted on two counts of malice murder and two counts of felony murder. Prosecutors alleged Osborne murdered Jones after he was confronted about the money from the motorcycle sale. Jones had demanded Osborne give him the USD 400, and Osborne had killed him in retaliation, as well as Seaborne because she was a witness. On August 14, 1991, a jury found Osborne guilty, and he was sentenced to death the following day.

Execution 
On June 4, 2008, Osborne was executed via lethal injection. He refused any special last meal and made no final statement. He had initially been scheduled for execution at around 7:00 p.m., however, the execution was delayed when the executioners took over thirty-five minutes to find a suitable vein they could use to administer the lethal drugs.

See also 
 Capital punishment in Georgia (U.S. state)
 Capital punishment in the United States
 List of people executed in Georgia (U.S. state)
 List of people executed in the United States in 2008

References 

1970 births
2008 deaths
21st-century executions by Georgia (U.S. state)
21st-century executions of American people
People executed for murder
People from Spalding County, Georgia
People executed by Georgia (U.S. state) by lethal injection
American people convicted of murder
People convicted of murder by Georgia (U.S. state)
Executed African-American people
Executed people from Georgia (U.S. state)
21st-century African-American people